Robert Hamilton Moberly was the 7th Anglican Bishop of Stepney from 1936 until 1952 when he was appointed Dean of Salisbury.

He was born into an eminent ecclesiastical family in 1884 and educated at Winchester College and New College, Oxford before embarking on an ecclesiastical career with a curacy at Dover.  During the Great War, he served from June, 1917, as a Temporary Chaplain to the Forces, and was regarded as ‘A1’. Inner city posts followed before promotion to the Suffragan Bishopric of Stepney, a post he held until transferring to the Deanery at Salisbury sixteen years later. A brilliant scholar he died in 1978.

Notes

References

External links
 National Portrait Gallery: Bromide print of Robert Hamilton Moberly by Elliot & Fry, 1952

1884 births
People educated at Winchester College
Alumni of New College, Oxford
Bishops of Stepney
Deans of Salisbury
20th-century Church of England bishops
1978 deaths